Blake Leary (born 4 December 1990) is an Australian professional rugby league footballer who plays as a  forward and  for the New York Freedom in the North American Rugby League. 

He previously played for Manly-Warringah and the North Queensland Cowboys over two separate spells in the NRL. He also played for the Lézignan Sangliers in the Elite One Championship.

Background
Lear was born in Mona Vale, New South Wales, Australia and moved to the Gold Coast, Queensland at the age of one.

He played his junior football for the Nerang Roosters and attended Keebra Park State High School, before being signed by the Melbourne Storm in 2009. As a youngster, Leary played for the Queensland Under 18s team.

Playing career
In 2009 and 2010, Leary played for the Melbourne Storm's NYC team, scoring 17 tries, 5 goals and 1 field goal in 26 games. He captained the team in 2010.

In 2011, Leary joined the North Queensland Cowboys, playing for their Queensland Cup team, Northern Pride RLFC. Shortly after being suspended in 2011, Leary injured his knee, requiring a knee reconstruction and missed the rest of the season. In 2012, he recovered from his knee reconstruction to train with the Cowboys first-grade squad.

In Round 25 of the 2012 NRL season, Leary made his NRL debut for the Cowboys against the Newcastle Knights.

At the beginning of 2014, Leary was released by the Cowboys.

In July 2014, Leary played for the Queensland Residents team.

On 1 October 2014, Leary signed a 2-year contract with the Manly Warringah Sea Eagles starting in 2015.

On 14 November 2016, Leary returned to north Queensland, signing with the Townsville Blackhawks after two seasons with Manly. Over the 2017 pre-season, Leary trained with his former club, the North Queensland Cowboys. He scored a try in the Cowboys' 11-10 trial win over the Sydney Roosters but did not earn an NRL contract with the club.

In Round 6 of the 2017 NRL season, Leary was recalled by the Cowboys, coming off the bench against the Wests Tigers. He would play 3 games for the Cowboys in 2017, starting at hooker in two of those games.

In 2018, Leary returned to the Gold Coast, joining the Burleigh Bears in the Intrust Super Cup in Queensland, the Bears took the title in 2019.

NY Freedom
On 23 May 2021, it was announced on the NY Freedom Instagram social media account that Leary had signed for the New York Freedom to play in their inaugural 2021 season in the North American Rugby League.

Statistics

NRL

References

External links
Manly Sea Eagles profile
2012 North Queensland Cowboys profile

1990 births
Living people
Australian rugby league players
Burleigh Bears players
Manly Warringah Sea Eagles players
New York Freedom Rugby League players
North Queensland Cowboys players
Northern Pride RLFC players
People educated at Keebra Park State High School
Rugby league hookers
Rugby league locks
Rugby league players from New South Wales
Rugby league second-rows
Townsville Blackhawks players